"Biological role of oxygen" can mean:
 Dioxygen in biological reactions, biological role of the dioxygen (O2) substance
 Compounds of oxygen #Organic compounds, biological role of the element 8O (oxygen)